Laane may refer to:

Places

Estonia 
Laane, Kõue Parish, village in Kõue Parish, Harju County
Laane, Padise Parish, village in Padise Parish, Harju County
Laane, Tartu County, village in Ülenurme Parish, Tartu County
Laane, Viljandi County, village in Kõpu Parish, Viljandi County
Lääne County, one of 15 counties of Estonia

People
Rait-Riivo Laane (born 1993), Estonian basketball player

Organizations
Lääne Elu, an Estonian language newspaper